Perilestes is a genus of damselflies in the family Perilestidae. There are about eight described species in Perilestes.

Species
These eight species belong to the genus Perilestes:
 Perilestes attenuatus Selys, 1886
 Perilestes bispinus Kimmins, 1958
 Perilestes eustaquioi Machado, 2015
 Perilestes fragilis Hagen in Selys, 1862
 Perilestes gracillimus Kennedy, 1941
 Perilestes kahli Williamson & Williamson, 1924
 Perilestes minor Williamson & Williamson, 1924
 Perilestes solutus Williamson & Williamson, 1924

References

Further reading

 
 
 

Lestoidea
Articles created by Qbugbot